Gunnar Guillermo Nielsen (born 12 October 1983 in Posadas, Misiones) is an Argentine football player of Danish descent, currently playing for Hillerød GI. He previously represented FC Fredericia and Kolding FC.

Notes

1983 births
Living people
People from Posadas, Misiones
Argentine people of Danish descent
Argentine footballers
Hillerød Fodbold players
IF Skjold Birkerød players
Association football midfielders
Sportspeople from Misiones Province